The Malaysia Book of Records (or MBR) is a Malaysian project to publish records set or broken by Malaysians. The project complements Prime Minister Tun Dr Mahathir Bin Mohamad's 'Malaysia Boleh!' (Malaysia Can! in English) campaign. As with the Guinness World Records, there is an annually published book listing the records.

Aims 
The MBR is a project formed in line with the peoples Vision 2020.

Realising that feats and record attempts were not recorded, Datuk Danny Ooi, (founder of The Malaysia Book of Records) felt that recognition should be given to record achievements by Malaysians. As the National Record-Keeper, MBR is an official body that recognises record-holders, record-breakers, and record creators in the country. Upon confirmation of a record, the MBR will issue certificates to the record holder as a recognition for their efforts.

Origin and history

Beginnings 
The idea was conceived in 1990 when Danny Ooi stumbled upon questions regarding extraordinary feats by Malaysians. He recalled seeing a man cycling for days at the Merdeka Stadium, trying to set a world record, and another individual, who travelled from state to state by walking. The latter was hoping his attempt could be entered in the Guinness Book of World Records.

Realising that none of these feats would be recorded, Mr. Ooi felt that recognition should be given to such determination exhibited by Malaysians.

Striving for excellence 
Achievements were compiled for publication into the MBR and were also included in its production shown in a TV series called The Malaysia Book of Records' weekly TV series, which debuted on October 6, 1996 on RTM TV2. The MBR will serve as a medium with which to acknowledge Malaysians who have promoted their country by creating records.

The first record book entitled "The Malaysia Book of Records' First Edition" was launched on December 9, 1998, unveiling the Malaysian records in one book for the first time.

Award ceremony 
MBR Awards Night at National and State Level started in December 1998, when the Malaysia Book of Records organised a national level and two states' level, Sabah and Melaka respectively at MBR Awards Night.

See also 

The MBR connection
 Danny Ooi 
 Mahathir bin Mohammad
 Malaysia
 Malaysia Boleh! 
 Wan Hashim Wan Mahmood

Malaysian Record Breakers and Achievements
 KL Tower
 Nicol David
 M. Magendran
 Petronas Twin Towers
 Vision 2020
 Arulmigu Sri Rajakaliamman Glass Temple
 Penang Second Bridge

Miscellaneous relations
 Guinness World Records

Notes

References

External links 
 
 "The biggest, the best, the first -- Malaysia's mania for records", retrieved on March 13, 2000AD from the Rekord-Klub SAXONIA.
 "The World Record-Breaking Capital", retrieved on April, 2006AD from the Wired Magazine.

Malaysian books
Trivia books
1996 establishments in Malaysia
Book series introduced in 1998
Publications established in 1998
1990s Malaysian television series
1998 Malaysian television series debuts